The Canaan Baptist Church is a historic African-American church in Covington, Tennessee. The congregation was established in 1868. The church building was built in 1916 and was listed on the U.S. National Register of Historic Places in 1999. It is the oldest African-American church in Covington.

References

Covington, Tennessee
Churches on the National Register of Historic Places in Tennessee
Buildings and structures in Tipton County, Tennessee
Churches completed in 1916
Religious organizations established in 1868
1868 establishments in Tennessee
National Register of Historic Places in Tipton County, Tennessee